Bačka Oblast was one of the oblasts of the Kingdom of Serbs, Croats and Slovenes from 1922 to 1929. Its administrative center was Novi Sad.

History
The Kingdom of Serbs, Croats and Slovenes was formed in 1918 and was initially divided into counties and districts (this division was inherited from previous state administrations). In 1922, new administrative units known as oblasts (Serbo-Croatian: oblasti / области) were introduced and the whole country was divided into 33 oblasts. Before 1922, territory of Bačka Oblast was part of the Novi Sad County.

In 1929, 33 oblasts were administratively replaced with 9 banovinas and one district, and territory of Bačka Oblast was administratively included into the Danube Banovina.

Geography
The Bačka Oblast included western parts of Bačka and region of Baranja. It shared borders with the Belgrade Oblast in the east, the Syrmia Oblast in the south, the Osijek Oblast in the west, and Hungary in the north-west.

Demographics
According to 1921 census, oblast had linguistically heterogeneous population: speakers of Serbo-Croatian were dominant in the cities of Novi Sad, Sombor and Subotica; speakers of German were dominant in the districts of Apatin, Darda, Kula, Odžaci, Sombor and Stara Palanka; speakers of Hungarian were dominant in the districts of Topola and Batina; while speakers of Slovak were dominant in the district of Novi Sad.

Administrative units
Oblast included following districts:
Apatin
Batina
Darda
Odžaci
Kula
Novi Sad
Sombor
Stara Palanka
Topola

Besides these districts, several cities in the oblast had a separate status:
Novi Sad
Sombor
Subotica

Cities and towns
Main cities and towns in the district were:
Apatin
Kula
Novi Sad
Sombor
Stara Palanka
Subotica
Temerin
Vrbas

All mentioned cities and towns are today in Serbia.

See also
Bačka
Kingdom of Serbs, Croats and Slovenes

References

Further reading
Istorijski atlas, Geokarta, Beograd, 1999.
Istorijski atlas, Intersistem kartografija, Beograd, 2010.

External links
Map of the Oblast
Map of the Oblast
Map of the Oblast

 

History of Novi Sad
History of Bačka
History of Baranya (region)
Yugoslav Serbia
20th century in Vojvodina
Yugoslav Croatia
Oblasts of the Kingdom of Serbs, Croats and Slovenes